Blood Conflict (Spanish: Conflicto de sangre) is a 1953 Chilean film directed by Vinicio Valdivia.

Cast
 Marcela Benítez 
 Carmen Bunster 
 Eugenio Guzmán 
 Héctor Márquez
 Claudio Taít

References

Bibliography 
  Terry Ramsaye. Motion Picture and Television Almanac. Quigley Publications, 1954.

External links 
 

1953 films
Chilean drama films
1950s Spanish-language films